Shah Ahmad Noorani Siddiqi (1 October 1926 – 11 December 2003, known as Allama Noorani) was a Pakistani Islamic scholar, mystic, philosopher, revivalist and politician. Siddiqi was founder of the World Islamic Mission, leader of the Jamiat Ulema-e-Pakistan (JUP) and founder president of the Muttahida Majlis-e-Amal (MMA).

Early life
Ahmad Noorani was born in Meerut, India (now India), into an Urdu-speaking Siddiqui Shaikh family on 31 March 1926 (17 Ramadan 1344). His father, Abdul Aleem Siddiqi was also an Islamic scholar and had accompanied him on Islamic missionary tours to various parts of the world in his early youth. He received his BA degree in Arabic language from the Allahabad University, and certified from the Darul-Uloom in Meerut in Islamic jurisprudence. He became a hafiz-ul-Quran at the age of eight. His family moved to Karachi, Sindh, Pakistan after the partition of India. He established World Islamic Mission in 1972 which is based in Mecca, Saudi Arabia.

He established himself as Islamic scholar and worked in the developing the Islamic philosophy as well as helping found the World Islamic Mission in 1972.
He has been described as a polyglot who "was conversant with 17 languages and eloquent in six, Urdu, Arabic, English, Persian, French and Swahili."

Career
Noorani was elected as member of the National Assembly from Constituency NW-134 (Karachi-VII) after participating in general elections held in 1970 on Jamiat Ulema-e-Pakistan's platform.

The JUP was the main Barelvi political party of Pakistan until the establishment of Tehreek-e-Labbaik Pakistan.

The second time he was elected as MNA from Constituency NA-167 (Hyderabad-II) in 1977 Pakistani general election. Since then, his influence on national politics further grew and he became a Senator in 1980s.
After disassociating from politics in 1990s, he made his notable come back after rigorously opposing and further forming an ultra–conservative alliance to oppose the regime of President Pervez Musharraf. Assuming the presidency of Muttahida Majlis-e-Amal (MMA), he was known to use tough rhetoric against Musharraf and formed a public support against Musharraf's policies in the country.

Role for strengthening democracy in Pakistan
Noorani took stand against the martial law regime of Muhammad Zia-ul-Haq. His party was one of the founding members of Pakistan National Alliance (PNA) formed on January 10, 1977 and “Pakistan Awami Ittihad” (PAI) in 1988. 
During Zia's regime, he raised his voice for the rehabilitation of the political parties, restoration of the judicial powers and finishing the military courts, elimination of the Martial law; and announcement of the election schedule. He was also guiding force for the formation of another electoral alliance Islami Jamhuri Mahaz in May 1999. Through his efforts, Noorani, formed an alliance of six religious, political parties, named as the Muttahida Majlis-i-Amal (MMA), came into being in 2001. He was chosen as its founding President.

Views
Noorani argued with ideologies such as Deobandi, Wahhabism, Salafism and Ahl-i Hadith, and most strictly from Ahmadiyya. He spent his scholarly life in promoting Barelvism and Ahmed Raza Khan as the Mujaddid (Muslim Reviver) of the 14th Islamic century.

Death
On 11 December 2003 (17 Shawwal 1424), Noorani died from a massive heart attack when he was preparing to leave his residence for the Parliament House to address a press conference along with other opposition leaders at noon. The funeral prayer was done in Nishtar Park on Friday and he was buried at the foot of his mother in the graveyard situated in the premises of the Abdullah Shah Ghazi Mausoleum in Karachi.

Condolences
Pervez Musharraf expressed profound grief in a condolence message in which he paid tribute to Noorani for his "great services for Pakistan and his tremendous contributions to national politics. MMA General Secretary Maulana Fazal-ur-Rehman described the passing away of Noorani as a "great loss for the whole nation." Fazal said Noorani was a "moderate, polite and kind person and due to his qualities he was elected as chief of the united religious front.

References

1926 births
2003 deaths
Muhajir people
Islam in India
Islam in Pakistan
World Islamic Mission
People from Meerut
Pakistani Sunni Muslim scholars of Islam
University of Allahabad alumni
Islamic democracy activists
Urdu-language non-fiction writers
Pakistani theologians
Quranic exegesis scholars
Islamic mysticism
Jamiat Ulema-e-Pakistan politicians
Barelvis
Critics of Ahmadiyya